This is a list of episodes of the Korean computer animated television series Pororo the Little Penguin.

Season 1 (2003-2004)

Season 2 (2005-2006)

Season 3 (2009) 

Pororo the Little Penguin